The TM-46 mine is a large, circular, metal-cased Soviet anti-tank mine. It uses either a pressure or tilt-rod fuze, which is screwed into the top. Anti-tank mines with this type of fuze were capable of inflicting much more damage to armored vehicles, when compared to a typical AP mine. 

Because the TM-46 has a metal casing, it is very easy to detect with a metal detector. However, mine-fields containing TM-46s may have also been sown with minimum metal mines, e.g. the PMA-2.

Combat Use 
The mine was used by the North Vietnamese forces during the Vietnam War, and is found in many countries in Africa, the Middle East and South East Asia.

Action

MVM-583 fuze 
The MVM-583 is a mechanical pressure fuze. The activation pressure of this fuze is 140 kf. It comprises a striking mechanism, safety pin and the MD-6N shock tube detonator.

Upon a vehicle driving over a TM-46 mine equipped with this fuze, the lid of the mine deforms along with the fuze. Upon further deformation, the tip of the fuze casing cuts through the diaphragm in the mine, releasing the striking mechanism, which activates the MD-6N detonator, and causes the explosion of the main charge of the mine.

MVSh-46 fuze 
The MVSh-46 is a mechanical tilt-rod fuze without a safety mechanism. The activation pressure of this fuze is 120–450 kf. The required deviation of the tilt-rod from its initial composition is 25–30°. It comprises a striking mechanism and the MD-10 shock tube detonator.

Upon a vehicle driving over a TM-46 mine equipped with this fuze, the MVSh-46 deforms, activating the MD-10 detonator and causing the explosion of the main charge of the mine.

TMN-46 variant 
The TMN-46 is a variant of the mine fitted with a secondary pull-action fuze MUV-2 (Rus. МУВ-2) well on the bottom (where it cannot be seen), which is slightly off-set from the centre of the mine. It is connected with a thin strip of wire to a peg inserted into the ground. The MUV-2 fuze is hooked to an MD-6N (Rus. МД-6Н) shock tube detonator, which functions as an anti-handling device. Upon trying to move the mine, the wire pulls the fuze, and the mine detonates.

Upon an attempt at dislocation of the TMN-46 mine, the wire attached between the MUV-2 fuze and the peg pulls the safety pin. The fuze actives MD-6N detonator and causes it to explode along with the main charge of the mine.

Specifications 
Diameter: 305 mm
Height
With MVM-583 fuze: 108 mm
With MVSh-46 tilt rod fuze: 260 mm
Activation pressure: 120–450 kf (21 kg tilt pressure)
Weight
Full assembly: 8.6 kg
Charge: 5.7 kg (TNT)

See also 
TM-57 mine (an improved version of the TM-46)
TM-62 series of mines

References

Anti-tank mines
Land mines of the Soviet Union
Cold War weapons of the Soviet Union